Kuruppu Arachchige Karunaratne (or K.A. Karunaratne; 29 April 1960 – 6 April 2008) was a Sri Lankan long-distance runner who specialized in the marathon event.

As a runner he won 1990 Singapore Marathon in a time of 2:21:10, competed at the 1992 Summer Olympics and the 1993 World Championships.

He was killed on 6 April 2008 along with 14 others by a suicide bomber, who exploded himself at the start of a marathon race which was part of the Sinhala and Tamil New Year celebration in Weliveriya town. Sri Lanka's national athletics coach Lakshman de Alwis and politician Jeyaraj Fernandopulle were also killed in the bombing which wounded 90 others.

Achievements 
 All results regarding marathon, unless stated otherwise

See also 
 2008 Weliveriya bombing

References

External links
 
 

1960 births
2008 deaths
Athletes (track and field) at the 1992 Summer Olympics
Olympic athletes of Sri Lanka
People murdered in Sri Lanka
Sri Lankan male long-distance runners
Sri Lankan male marathon runners
Sri Lankan murder victims
Sri Lankan terrorism victims
Suicide bombings in Sri Lanka
Terrorism deaths in Sri Lanka
Terrorist incidents in Sri Lanka in 2008
Filmed assassinations
Mass murder victims
Athletes (track and field) at the 1990 Asian Games
World Athletics Championships athletes for Sri Lanka
Asian Games competitors for Sri Lanka
20th-century Sri Lankan people
21st-century Sri Lankan people